Akrund is a small village in Dhansura Taluka of Aravalli district of northern Gujarat in western India.

References

Villages in Aravalli district